Rakesh Mohanty (born 19 September 1985) is an Indian cricketer. He played 19 first-class and 19 List A matches between 2004 and 2014. He was also part of India's squad for the 2002 Under-19 Cricket World Cup.

References

External links
 

1985 births
Living people
Indian cricketers
Odisha cricketers
People from Cuttack
Cricketers from Odisha